Outrapo stands for "Ouvroir de tragicomédie potentielle", which translates roughly as "workshop of potential tragicomedy".  It was founded  in London, in 1991, and it seeks to mine the potentialities of stage performance, using new or preexistent constraints.

The members, by order of entry in scene are:
Stanley Chapman
Milie von Bariter
Cosima Schmetterling
Jean-Pierre Poisson
Anne Feillet
Felix Pruvost
Tom Stoppard

See also

Theatrical constraints
Ouxpo
Oulipo

References

External links 

 Outrapo website (in French)
 Outrapo Youtube channel
 Outrapist workplan
 An Ouvroir Dedicated to the Theatre by Stanley Chapman
 Censorship as Liberation by Milie von Bariter

'Pataphysics
Alternative theatre
Experimental theatre